Slow Dancer is the sixth album by Boz Scaggs, originally released by Columbia in 1974. It was produced by former Motowner Johnny Bristol of "Hang On In There Baby" fame. 

The album was initially released with a cover photo of Scaggs walking alone on the beach, with the back of the album framing a head and shoulders shot of Scaggs lying on the beach. The photographs were taken by Annie Leibovitz. After the breakout success of 1976's Silk Degrees, Slow Dancer was re-released with a new cover showing Scaggs and a woman in fine clothing, Scaggs bending to kiss her bosom. This photo was taken by Ethan Russell.

Track listing
All tracks composed by Boz Scaggs, except where indicated

Side One
 "You Make It So Hard (To Say No)" - 3:32
 "Slow Dancer" (George Daly, Scaggs) - 3:10
 "Angel Lady (Come Just In Time)" (Johnny Bristol, Jim McDonough, Scaggs) - 3:28
 "There Is Someone Else" - 4:32
 "Hercules" (Allen Toussaint) - 4:03

Side Two
 "Pain of Love" (Johnny Bristol) -3:10
 "Sail on White Moon" (Johnny Bristol) - 3:13
 "Let It Happen" (Johnny Bristol, Scaggs) - 3:18
 "I Got Your Number" (Johnny Bristol, Gregory Reeves) - 3:43
 "Take It for Granted" - 4:19

Charts

Personnel
Boz Scaggs – vocals, guitar
David Cohen, David T. Walker, Dennis Coffey, Greg Poree, Jay Graydon, Wah Wah Watson, Red Rhodes – guitars
Clarence McDonald, Jerry Peters, Joe Sample, Mike Melvoin, Russell Turner - keyboards
James Jamerson, Jim Hughart – bass
Ernie Watts, Fred Jackson, John Kelson – saxophone
George Bohanon, Lon Norman – trombone
Chuck Findley, Jack H. Laubach, Paul Hubinon, Warren Roché – trumpet, flugehorn
Gene Estes, John Arnold – percussion, vibraphone
Ed Greene, James Gadson – drums
Joe Clayton, King Errison – congas
Carolyn Willis, Julia Tillman Waters, Lorna Willard, Myrna Matthews, Pat Henderson - background vocals
H.B. Barnum – string arrangements, conductor
Technical
Producer – Johnny Bristol
Engineer – Greg Venable
Remix – Al Schmitt
Photography – Ethan Russell
Artwork by Tony Lane

References

External links
Slow Dancer Lyrics

Boz Scaggs albums
1974 albums
Albums arranged by H. B. Barnum
Albums produced by Johnny Bristol
Columbia Records albums